The State Opening of Parliament includes a State Procession, a formal display of the Sovereign, dignified by a sizeable entourage made up of Great Officers of State, members of the royal family and of the Royal Household. The State Procession is now confined to the interior of the Palace of Westminster, but in earlier centuries it followed an outdoor route to and from Westminster Abbey.

The State Opening of Parliament is one of the few occasions when a State Procession is to be seen; the Coronation Procession is another.

Historical background 

An account of Henry VII opening Parliament on 7 November 1485 includes a description of the processions which preceded it. By this time the pattern had become established whereby the Peers of the Realm would assemble at the Palace of Westminster (which was the King's principal residence). They would then go in procession on foot to nearby Westminster Abbey for Mass, prior to returning in procession to the Palace for the Opening of Parliament itself. (During the Mass, the Knights and Burgesses who had been elected to represent the Commons would gather in the Parliament Chamber for a roll-call, overseen by the Lord Steward who would leave the Abbey early for this purpose.)

In due course, the heralds, who had the responsibility (under the Earl Marshal's direction) for marshalling the procession, began to keep detailed records of the event, the earliest of which dates from Henry VIII's first Opening of Parliament in 1510. The 1512 account includes an illustration of the Procession depicting participants together with their armorial bearings. It shows the Lords Spiritual at the front of the procession, accompanied by Heralds and Gentleman Ushers; the Serjeants-at-Arms follow with their maces, just ahead of Garter King of Arms. The King is preceded by the Cap of Maintenance, borne by the Lord High Constable and the Sword of State, borne by his son. The King himself carries a sceptre and walks beneath a richly-decorated canopy supported by four monks. His train-bearer is the Lord Great Chamberlain (carrying his white wand of office), who is 'assisted by' the Lord Chamberlain. The Lords Temporal follow, among whom can be seen the Lord Steward (with his white wand of office).

Change was necessitated after the Palace of Westminster was severely damaged by fire in 1514. In both 1523 and 1529, the Opening of Parliament took place in Bridewell Palace, following a service in nearby Blackfriars Church. At around this time, Westminster ceased to be a royal residence, becoming instead the fixed abode of Parliament itself. In 1536, the procession set off from the new royal residence of Whitehall. Three years later, the King, Peers and attendants were to be seen riding in procession from Whitehall to the Abbey, in their robes and on horseback. This precedent was followed in subsequent years; queenElizabeth I rode on occasion or else was carried in a horse-borne litter (as had been her sister Queen Mary I, a practice that would also be followed by Queen Anne over a century later). On occasion (and especially in times of plague) the King would travel by river from Whitehall to Westminster, using a State Barge.

For the 1679 State Opening, there was no procession and no service in the Abbey (for fear of a Popish Plot). The service was not reinstated, so subsequent processions went directly from the Palace of Whitehall to the Palace of Westminster. At about this time, the practice of all Peers taking part in the procession ceased (due in no small part to the increasing size of the Peerage). In 1698, Whitehall Palace burned down; thereafter St James's became the usual point of departure. In the Georgian period, carriages began regularly to be used for the procession to Westminster (though this was not entirely new - both Elizabeth I (on occasion) and Oliver Cromwell had used carriages to get to the State Opening). Under George IV, the Palace of Westminster was remodeled by Sir John Soane to provide space for the carriages, a robing room, and a grand interior processional route to the House of Lords.

The Old Palace of Westminster was largely destroyed by fire in 1834. The new Palace was purpose built (among other things) to accommodate the ceremonial of a State Opening. Thus in Victoria's reign, the long-established ceremonial of the State Opening was married to its now-familiar architectural setting of Barry and Pugin's grand parliamentary interiors. The pattern of events then was much as it is now: the monarch, members of the royal family and members of the Household arrive in a Carriage Procession from Buckingham Palace (preceded by the items of royal regalia with their attendants); after a time of preparation, the monarch proceeds in State from the King's Robing Room, through the Royal Gallery and Prince's Chamber, to the Throne in the House of Lords.

Present-day Participants in the Procession 
The Procession falls into four main sections:

 The Officers of arms, two Serjeants-at-Arms and the Gentleman (or Lady) Usher of the Black Rod
 The Great Officers of State
 The King and The Queen consort (immediately preceded by peers carrying the Sword of State, the Cap of Maintenance and (if it is not worn by the Monarch) the Imperial State Crown)
 Members of the Royal Household

The latter contingent includes a combination of royal officials and attendants, plus others who are there by virtue of holding honorary positions in the Royal Household (namely several Government Whips and the professional heads of the Armed Services).

As of 2023, the Procession is constituted as follows:

Former Participants 
The Lord Chamberlain of the Household always used to take part (as one of the three great officers of the Household), but since the time of Charles II he has remained instead at the monarch's residence where he holds a Member of Parliament 'hostage' pending the monarch's safe return.

Until 1998 two Gentleman Ushers were in the procession, in addition to the Gentleman Usher of the Black Rod and the Gentleman Usher to the Sword of State (who conveys the sword to and from the Palace of Westminster). Gentleman Ushers have been in attendance at State Openings since at least the 15th century.

Until 1998 the Queen was attended by three Ladies in Waiting: a Woman of the Bedchamber, a Lady of the Bedchamber and the Mistress of the Robes; subsequently only two of the three have attended.

In the first year of her reign the Groom of the Robes attended, and walked immediately behind the Queen; since then no new appointment has been made; one of the Equerries is instead designated 'Acting Groom of the Robes' for the occasion.

Until 1998 the executive senior officers of the various corps on duty were in the procession (the Lieutenant of the Gentleman at Arms, the Lieutenant of the Yeomen of the Guard, Silver Stick and the Field Officer in Brigade Waiting) as well as the Crown Equerry (the executive head of the Royal Mews). They do not now take part in the procession, but are still in attendance elsewhere in and around the Palace.

At the same time, the three service chiefs (the Chief of the Naval Staff, the Chief of the General Staff and the Chief of the Air Staff) were removed from the Procession, their place being taken by the more senior Chief of the Defence Staff. In 2012, however, the three service chiefs were reinstated (albeit with the Chief of the Defence Staff retaining his place) in the Procession.

Other members of the royal family
On some occasions, other senior members of the royal family have walked in the procession and occupied positions on the dais either side of the throne (sometimes accompanied by their spouses). The Princess Royal attended on eleven occasions in this capacity (between 1967 and 1985) though in recent years she has attended in her official capacity as Gold Stick-in-Waiting. The then-Prince of Wales  attended on sixteen occasions between 1967 and 1996 (on four of those occasions he was escorting The Queen in The Duke of Edinburgh's absence). From 2013 until his ascension in 2022 the then-Prince of Wales and Duchess of Cornwall were in regular attendance.

Prior to the passing of the House of Lords Act 1999, other members of the royal family who were Peers or Peeresses (including Dowagers) often used to attend the State Opening; they, however, were seated on the benches of the chamber with their peers and did not form part of the Procession.

See also 
 State Opening of Parliament

Notes

References

Parliament of the United Kingdom
British monarchy
State ritual and ceremonies
Annual events in London
Ceremonies in the United Kingdom